Md. Suhrab Uddin is a Jatiya Party politician and the incumbent member of parliament from Kishoreganj-2.

Early life
Uddin was born on 1 June 1956. He has a B.Com and a law degree.

Career
Uddin was elected to Parliament on 5 January 2014 from Kishoreganj-2 as a Bangladesh Grand Alliance candidate. He is a member of the Treasury Bench in the Parliament.

References

Awami League politicians
Living people
1956 births
10th Jatiya Sangsad members